, also known as Komaki Airport or Nagoya Airport, is an airport which lies within the local government areas of Toyoyama, Komaki, Kasugai and Nagoya in Aichi Prefecture, Japan. It was once an international airport, but is now a domestic secondary airport serving Nagoya while the current primary civil airport for Nagoya is Chūbu Centrair International Airport in Tokoname.

It is the main hub for FDA (Fuji Dream Airlines), the only airline that offers scheduled air service from the airfield. It is also used for general aviation and as an airbase.

Mitsubishi Aircraft Corporation is headquartered in the airport's terminal building, and its parent company Mitsubishi Heavy Industries produces the Mitsubishi Regional Jet aircraft at a factory adjacent to the airport.

Alternate names
 "Nagoya Airfield" is the name as the Ministry of Land, Infrastructure, Transport and Tourism of the national government, as of 2008, recognizes it as an "other airport".
 The airfield was  until the opening of Centrair on February 17, 2005.
 It has been conventionally called .
 Aichi Prefectural Government, the current owner of the airport nicknames it .
The four Boeing KC-767J tankers of the 404th Tactical Airlift Tanker Squadron are based there.

History
Nagoya Airport served as the main airport for Nagoya until the opening of Chubu Centrair International Airport on February 17, 2005. This airport IATA Airport Code used to be NGO (now overtaken by the new Centrair airport), and its ICAO Airport Code used to be RJNN when it was classified as a second class airport; the new designations are NKM for regional flights and RJNA designation for general aviation flights. Aichi Prefecture manages the facilities and regularly handles international business flights.

During the 1980s and early 1990s, Nagoya Airport was a busy international airport because of overflow from Japan's other international airports, New Tokyo International Airport (now Narita International Airport) near Tokyo and Osaka International Airport (Itami Airport) near Osaka.

Since the opening of Kansai International Airport in 1994, the airport's main traffic source has been the nearby automotive and manufacturing industries, causing carriers such as United Airlines (San Francisco and Chicago–O'Hare) (United, as successor to Continental Airlines, currently serves Centrair Airport with flights to Guam) and Delta Air Lines (Portland (OR)) (Delta, as successor to Northwest Airlines, currently serves Centrair Airport with flights to Detroit) to stop flying to Nagoya. Some discount holiday flights still operated from Nagoya, drawing passengers from the Kansai region.
On the other hand, the cargo handling capacity of Nagoya Airport was not enough to satisfy the demands from the regional economy and air cargo shifted to Narita and Kansai.
In addition, the airport was hampered by its location in a residential area of Aichi Prefecture, limiting the number of flights that can use the airport, as well as the hours in which they can fly.

Because of these reasons, a new airport, Chubu Centrair International Airport, was built on an island south of Nagoya. On February 17, 2005, nearly all of Nagoya Airport's commercial transport flights moved to Centrair. On the same day, the old airport became a general aviation and airbase facility, as well as was renamed to the current names. It also became J-AIR's headquarters after a hub relocation from Hiroshima-Nishi Airport. The airline continued to operate through the airport until Fuji Dream Airlines opened a base at the airport and a corporate restructuring of its parent company Japan Airlines in 2010 resulted in J-Air's departure from the airport and moving of its operation base to Itami Airport in Osaka. A dedicated business aviation terminal and commuter flights within Japan then became the key features of Nagoya's secondary airport. The Aichi Museum of Flight opened at the airport in November 2017.

Military use

Imperial Period
Nagoya Airport was first opened in 1944 as a military airport named Kamake Airfield. It was primarily used as the home base of the 55th Sentai of the Imperial Japanese Army Air Service. As such, it was attacked on several occasions during the Pacific War in 1944 and 1945 by USAAF B-29 Superfortress bombing raids.

U.S. period
After the end of World War II, the airfield was taken over by the American occupation forces and renamed Nagoya Air Base. Reconstruction of the heavily damaged airfield began and in May 1946, Nagoya became the Headquarters of the Fifth Air Force, which controlled Air Force occupation units throughout Japan. In December 1950 during the Korean War, Fifth Air Force headquarters was moved to South Korea; however, it returned to Nagoya Air Base in September 1954 and remained until July 1957 when it moved to Fuchu Air Station in Tokyo as part of the USAF return of Nagoya Airport to Japanese control.

The U.S. primarily used Nagoya Air Base as a headquarters station for the next ten years, stationing several command and control units at the base:
 308th Bombardment Wing, 1 Mar 1947-30 Jun 1948
 Moved to Nagoya in March from Kimpo Air Base, South Korea where it had been performing occupation duty since moving there from Okinawa in September 1945

 85th Fighter Wing, 1 Jun 1947-30 Jun 1948
 Moved from the Philippines to set up an air defense organization in Japan.

 314th Air Division, 1 Dec 1950-1 Mar 1952
 Activated at Nagoya. During the Korean War it assumed the missions of airfield construction and defense of Japan as well as providing logistical support for the Fifth Air Force.

Operational use from the airfield began in February 1947 when the 347th Fighter Group (All Weather) began operating P-61 Black Widow interceptor aircraft, which were used to provide air defense for Japan. It operated from the airfield until June 1950 when the Black Widows were retired and the unit was inactivated.

After the Armistice in South Korea which ended combat, the 49th Fighter Group moved to Nagoya Air Base with F-84 Thunderjets. The unit provided air defense until June 1957 when it moved to Misawa Air Base.

The 6110th Air Base Group, which had maintained the base and the myriad of ground support units at the base since the Americans moved in during 1946 began phasing down after July 1957. The 6110th USAF Hospital remained open until 30 June 1958 when the last Americans left Nagoya Airfield and it was returned to Japanese control.

Japan Self-Defense Force
In 2009 the first dedicated air-to-air refueling squadron of the Japan Air Self-Defense Force was formed at Komaki. Named the 404th Tactical Airlift Tanker Squadron, it is equipped with Boeing KC-767J aircraft.

Statistics

Incidents and accidents
On April 26, 1994, an Airbus A300B4-622R jet operating as China Airlines Flight 140 (B-1816) from Taipei to Nagoya crashed onto the south-east corner of the airport apron whilst trying to land on Runway 34, killing 264 of the 271 people on board.  It is the second deadliest crash on Japanese soil, after Japan Airlines Flight 123.
On October 31, 2007, a Mitsubishi F-2 fighter jet, whilst on a test flight, crashed and exploded in flames during takeoff. Both pilots survived the incident with minor injuries.
On May 30, 2015, Solar Impulse 2, en route from Nanjing Lukou International Airport in China to Kalaeloa Airport in Hawaii, made an emergency landing after diverting due to weather; it continued to Hawaii on 28 June.

Tenant squadrons
 Japan Air Self-Defense Force
 401st Tactical Airlift Squadron (Lockheed C-130H/KC-130H)
 404th Tactical Airlift Tanker Squadron (Boeing KC-767J)(2009-)

Airlines and destinations

Buses

Stage Carriage Coach
Airport Terminal Bus stop

Toyoyamachō Shakaikyōiku Center Bus stop

See also

Kawasaki Ki-61

References

 Maurer, Maurer (1983). Air Force Combat Units Of World War II. Maxwell AFB, Alabama: Office of Air Force History. .
 Ravenstein, Charles A. (1984). Air Force Combat Wings Lineage and Honors Histories 1947–1977. Maxwell AFB, Alabama: Office of Air Force History. .

External links

 Nagoya Airport Terminal Building

Airports in Japan
Transport in Nagoya
Airfields of the United States Army Air Forces in Occupied Japan
Japan Air Self-Defense Force bases
Science and technology in Japan
Buildings and structures in Aichi Prefecture
Airports established in 1944
Military facilities in Aichi Prefecture
1944 establishments in Japan
Toyoyama, Aichi